In mathematics, the Riemann–Siegel theta function is defined in terms of the gamma function as

for real values of t.  Here the argument is chosen in such a way that a continuous function is obtained and  holds, i.e., in the same way that the principal branch of the log-gamma function is defined.

It has an asymptotic expansion

 

where  denotes the polygamma function of order .
The Riemann–Siegel theta function is of interest in studying the Riemann zeta function, since it can rotate the Riemann zeta function such that it becomes the totally real valued Z function on the critical line  .

Curve discussion 

Theta as a function of a complex variable
We have an infinite series expression for the log-gamma function

where γ is Euler's constant. Substituting  for z and taking the imaginary part termwise gives the following series for θ(t)

For values with imaginary part between −1 and 1, the arctangent function is holomorphic, and it is easily seen that the series converges uniformly on compact sets in the region with imaginary part between −1/2 and 1/2, leading to a holomorphic function on this domain. It follows that the Z function is also holomorphic in this region, which is the critical strip.

We may use the identities

to obtain the closed-form expression

which extends our original definition to a holomorphic function of t.  Since the principal branch of log Γ has a single branch cut along the negative real axis, θ(t) in this definition inherits branch cuts along the imaginary axis above i/2 and below −i/2.

Gram points
The Riemann zeta function on the critical line can be written

If  is a real number, then the Z function  returns real values.

Hence the zeta function on the critical line will be real when
. Positive real values of  where this occurs are called Gram points, after J. P. Gram, and can of course also be described as the points where  is an integer.

A Gram point is a solution  of

These solutions are approximated by the sequence:

where  is the Lambert W function.

Here are the smallest non negative Gram points

The choice of the index n is a bit crude. It is historically chosen in such a way that the index is 0 at the first value which is larger than the smallest positive zero (at imaginary part 14.13472515 ...) of the Riemann zeta function on the critical line. Notice, this -function oscillates for absolute-small real arguments and therefore is not uniquely invertible in the interval [−24,24]! Thus the odd theta-function has its symmetric Gram point with value 0 at index −3.
At a Gram point 

and if this is positive at two successive Gram points,  must have a zero in the interval.

According to Gram’s law, the real part is usually positive while the imaginary part alternates with the Gram points, between positive and negative values at somewhat regular intervals.

The number of roots, in the strip from 0 to T, can be found by

where  is an error term which grows asymptotically like .

Only if  would obey Gram’s law, then finding the number of roots in the strip simply becomes

Today we know, that in the long run, Gram's law fails for about 1/4 of all Gram-intervals to contain exactly 1 zero of the Riemann zeta-function. Gram was afraid that it may fail for larger indices (the first miss is at index 126 before the 127th zero) and thus claimed this only for not too high indices. Later Hutchinson coined the phrase Gram's law for the (false) statement that all zeroes on the critical line would be separated by Gram points.

See also
Z function

References

 Gabcke, W. (1979), Neue Herleitung und explizierte Restabschätzung der Riemann-Siegel-Formel. Thesis, University of Göttingen. Revised version (eDiss Göttingen 2015)

External links

Wolfram Research – Riemann-Siegel Theta function (includes function plotting and evaluation)

Zeta and L-functions
Bernhard Riemann